Leo Monosson (Russian: Лев Исаакович Моносзон, lit. Lev Isaakovich Monoisson) (1897–1967) was a tenor singer born in Moscow, who found fame in Germany in the years 1928-1933. He spoke eleven languages and produced over 1400 records, one of his best-known being "Liebling, mein Herz lässt dich grüßen" with the Ben Berlin Orchestra. He was also an actor, appearing in films such as the musical The Three From the Filling Station. As a Jew, he had to leave Germany in 1933, moving first to France and then the United States. In New York, he started a new career as a stamp trader.

References
 Leo Monosson returns... with his true history!
  Cabaret-Berlin

External links
 Article in "Brigitte" magazine (German)
 Liebling, mein Herz lässt dich grüßen

1897 births
1967 deaths
Musicians from Moscow
Russian Jews
Russian tenors
Weimar culture
20th-century German male singers
20th-century Russian male singers
20th-century Russian singers
Soviet emigrants to Germany